Micromonospora echinaurantiaca is an endophytic actinomycete.

References

Further reading
Nakaew, Nareeluk, Wasu Pathom-aree, and Saisamorn Lumyong. “Generic diversity of rare actinomycetes from Thai cave soils and their possible use as new bioactive compounds.”日本放線菌学会誌 23.2 (2009): 21-26.

External links

LPSN
Type strain of Micromonospora echinaurantiaca at BacDive -  the Bacterial Diversity Metadatabase

Micromonosporaceae
Bacteria described in 2005